The Children and Family Relationships Act 2015 (Act No. 9 of 2015, bill no. 14 of 2015) amended family law in Ireland to extend parental rights and responsibilities to non-traditional families. It simplifies adoption rights for the spouse or civil partner of a biological parent, and for a long-term domestic partner. It also addresses donor-assisted reproduction (sperm donation and egg donation).

Background
Official reports related to the subject of the bill include the 2005 report of the Commission on Assisted Human Reproduction, and the 2010 report of the Law Reform Commission, which included a draft "children and parental responsibility bill". The Civil Partnership and Certain Rights and Obligations of Cohabitants Act 2010 provided for same-sex civil partnerships, and for shared rights within non-marital relationships, without addressing the issue of children within those relationships. The government elected in 2011 introduced the Thirty-first Amendment of the Constitution, relating to children's rights, which was approved at referendum in 2012 but not signed into law until 28 April 2015 because of a legal challenge to the conduct of the government during the referendum.

Legislature
The general scheme of the Children and Family Relationships Bill was published for consultation in January 2014 by Alan Shatter, the then Minister for Justice and Equality, and discussed by the Oireachtas Joint Committee on Justice, Defence and Equality in April 2014. The bill was introduced in Dáil Éireann on 17 February 2015 by Shatter's successor as minister, Frances Fitzgerald. The government had planned to have the bill enacted before the same-sex marriage referendum in May 2015, so that the issue of adoption by same-sex couples would not be used by opponents of same-sex marriage in the referendum campaign. Fitzgerald distinguished the family bill from the amendment bill at a seminar organised by the Children’s Rights Alliance. The bill was approved by the Dáil on 12 March. It passed the Seanad on 30 March, in a 20-2 vote and was signed into law by President Michael D. Higgins on 6 April 2015. All provisions of the act did not come into legal effect.

Senator Jim Walsh resigned from the Fianna Fáil parliamentary party over its support for the bill.

Commencement
 1 July 2015: The Children and Family Relationships Act 2015 (Part 10) (Commencement) Order 2015 commenced; specifying that Part 10 of the Act in its entirety commences.
 18 January 2016: The Children and Family Relationships Act 2015 (Commencement of Certain Provisions) Order 2016 commenced; specifying provisions of Parts 1, 4, 5, 6, 7, 8, 12 and 13 of the Act.
 4 May 2020: Children and Family Relationships Act 2015 (Parts 2 and 3) (Commencement) Order 2019 commenced; Parts 2 and 3.
 4 May 2020: Children and Family Relationships Act 2015 (Commencement of Certain Provisions) Order 2019 commenced; Parts 4, 6, 7 and 12, insofar as it is not already in operation, and section 176.

Amendment
Portions of the Act allowing for joint adoption, which never went into effect as no commencement order was signed, were repealed in 2017 after passage of the Adoption (Amendment) Act 2017, which legalised joint adoption by same-sex couples. Drafting errors in the Act were amended before they were commenced by the Children and Family Relationships (Amendment) Act 2018.

Public opinion
An opinion poll published in March 2015 indicated strong public support for some of the central provisions of the Bill, namely adoption rights for same-sex and cohabiting couples. Support in both cases was measured at over 70%

References

Sources

 Children and Family Relationships Bill 2015 (links to debates and amendments) Oireachtas

Citations

2015 in Irish law
Acts of the Oireachtas of the 2010s
Family law in the Republic of Ireland